The Milwaukee Open Invitational was a professional golf tournament in Wisconsin on the PGA Tour. It was played seven times from 1955 through 1961 at different courses in the Milwaukee area.

During its final year, Arnold Palmer skipped the tournament to prepare for the British Open, which he won. The field at North Hills Country Club in Menomonee Falls did include 21-year-old Jack Nicklaus of Ohio State, already a veteran of eight majors and the reigning NCAA champion, he won his second U.S. Amateur a month later. The purse was $30,000 and Bruce Crampton won by a stroke; his winner's share was $4,300. Nicklaus was three strokes back at 275 (−5), tied for sixth.

Two won the event twice, both at different courses: Cary Middlecoff (1955, 1958) and Ken Venturi (1957, 1960).

Miller Brewing Company was the title sponsor for the first five editions; the tournament was initiated in 1955 with a five-year agreement, part of the company's

Venues
The tournament was played at three courses in the Milwaukee area:

Blue Mound hosted the PGA Championship in 1933. The PGA Tour returned in 1968 with the Greater Milwaukee Open, which was played for 42 years, through 2009; it was played twice at Tripoli (1971, 1972).

Winners

See also
Other former PGA Tour events in Milwaukee
Greater Milwaukee Open, 1968–2009
Blue Ribbon Open, 1951
Milwaukee Open, 1940

References

External links
North Hills Country Club – 1960–61 host
Tripoli Country Club – 1956–59 host
Blue Mound Golf and Country Club – 1955 host

Former PGA Tour events
Golf in Wisconsin
Sports in Milwaukee
Recurring sporting events established in 1955
Recurring sporting events disestablished in 1961
1955 establishments in Wisconsin
1961 disestablishments in Wisconsin